Eri Hozumi and Makoto Ninomiya defeated Monica Niculescu and Alexandra Panova in the final, 6–7(7–9), 6–3, [10–8] to win the doubles tennis title at the 2022 Morocco Open.

María José Martínez Sánchez and Sara Sorribes Tormo were the defending champions from when the tournament was last held in 2019, but Martínez Sánchez retired from tennis in 2020, and Sorribes Tormo chose not to participate.

Seeds

Draw

Draw

References

 Main draw

Grand Prix SAR La Princesse Lalla Meryem - Doubles
2022 Doubles
2022 in Moroccan sport